For articles on Metropolitan council see:

 Metropolitan borough (England)
 Metropolitan Council (Minnesota)
 Metropolitan Council Transit Operations
 Metropolitan Council (Nashville)
 Metropolitan county (England)
 Metropolitan Toronto
 Metropolitan Council on Jewish Poverty (New York)